Niznik may refer to:
 Stephanie Niznik, an American actress
 Niznik Island, an island in Antarctica